Yeongnam Air was a small regional airline of South Korea launched on 25 July 2008. Its main base was Gimhae International Airport and Daegu International Airport. It flew to Jeju International Airport and Gimpo Airport with a single aircraft. Yeongnam Air ceased all flights in December 2008 and formally closed in 2009.

Destinations
Yeongnam Air served the following destinations prior to closure:

Fleet

Yeongnam Air operated only one aircraft throughout its operations, however the airline did plan on adding a second aircraft at a later date although this never materialised.

References

Defunct airlines of South Korea
Companies that have filed for bankruptcy in South Korea
Airlines established in 2006
Airlines disestablished in 2009
2006 establishments in South Korea
2009 disestablishments in South Korea